Daniel Jackson Sanders (February 15, 1847 – March 6, 1907) was a Presbyterian clergyman who served as president of Johnson C. Smith University in North Carolina and published a Presbyterian newspaper for African Americans. He was the first African-American president of a four-year college in the southern U.S.

Biography
Sanders was born a slave in Winnsboro, South Carolina on February 15, 1847.

Sanders attended Brainerd Institute and was a tutor at the school. He then graduated from Western Theological Seminary.

He published the Africo-American Presbyterian and served as president of Biddle University for 17 years.

Upon his death The Charlotte Observer reported that his students had always been "well-behaved".

References

1847 births
1907 deaths
Johnson C. Smith University
19th-century African-American people
African-American Christian clergy
19th-century Presbyterians
American Presbyterian ministers
19th-century American slaves
People from Winnsboro, South Carolina
American academic administrators
Heads of universities and colleges in the United States
Western Theological Seminary alumni
19th-century American clergy
20th-century African-American people